Metallotolerants are extremophile organisms that are able to survive in environments with a high concentration of dissolved heavy metals.  They can be found in environments containing arsenic, cadmium, copper, and zinc.  Known metallotolerants include Ferroplasma sp. and Cupriavidus metallidurans.

Metallotolerants adapt to their environment by reducing energy loss by excreting less.

Sinorhizobium sp. M14 is a metallotolerant bacterium.

References